John Adamson CBE (18 February 1857 – 2 May 1922) was an English-born Australian politician.

Early life
Born in Durham, he received a primary education before becoming a shoemaker, blacksmith and lay preacher. He migrated to Australia in 1878, becoming a Methodist minister in Queensland.

Politics

At the 1907 election, Adamson was elected to the Legislative Assembly of Queensland as the Labour member for Maryborough, serving until 2 October 1909 (the 1909 election).

On 25 February 1911, he was elected as the member for Rockhampton, serving until 21 March 1917.  He was Secretary for Railways from 1 June 1915 to 2 October 1916. Adamson left the Labor Party in the wake of the 1916 split over conscription, joining the National Party.

In 1919, he was part of the formation of a brief-lived state National Labor Party and then he was elected to the Australian Senate as a Nationalist Senator for Queensland. He served in the Senate from 1 July 1920 until his death on 2 May 1922. Following his death, the Queensland Government (then controlled by the Australian Labor Party) appointed John MacDonald, a Labor member, as his replacement.

Death
Adamson died in 1922 after he fell in front of a train at Hendra railway station. Reports at the time suggested suicide as he had been suffering from illness and depression for some time. He was accorded a state funeral which proceeded from the Albert Street Methodist Church to the Toowong Cemetery.

External links

References

 

Australian Labor Party members of the Parliament of Queensland
Nationalist Party of Australia members of the Parliament of Australia
Members of the Australian Senate for Queensland
Members of the Australian Senate
1857 births
1922 suicides
Members of the Queensland Legislative Assembly
Burials at Toowong Cemetery
20th-century Australian politicians
Suicides by train
Suicides in Queensland
Australian politicians who committed suicide
National Party (Queensland, 1917) members of the Parliament of Queensland
English emigrants to colonial Australia
Australian Methodist ministers

ar:جون آدامسون